James Hodges may refer to:

 James Hodges (mayor) (1822–1895), American politician and businessman
 James L. Hodges (1790–1846), delegate from Massachusetts in the United States House of Representatives
 James Hodges (1814–1879), builder and engineer who constructed the Pennyhill Park Hotel
 Jim Hodges (born 1956), governor of South Carolina from 1999 until 2003
 Jim Hodges (artist) (born 1957), New York-based installation artist

See also
 James Hodge (disambiguation)